Diego Pablo Seguí González  (born August 17, 1937) is a Cuban former professional baseball player. He played in Major League Baseball (MLB) as a right-handed pitcher for the Kansas City / Oakland Athletics, Washington Senators, Seattle Pilots, St. Louis Cardinals, Boston Red Sox. and Seattle Mariners. Seguí was a forkball specialist who was the 1970 American League ERA leader.

Professional baseball career
Seguí was born in Holguín, Cuba. 

In 1970 with Oakland, Seguí went 10–10 with two saves in 47 appearances (19 starts) while leading the American League pitchers with a 2.56 ERA.

On December 7, 1973, he was traded by St. Louis along with Reggie Cleveland and Terry Hughes to the Red Sox in exchange for John Curtis, Lynn McGlothen and Mike Garman.

Seguí holds the unique distinction of having pitched for both of Seattle's major league baseball teams, the Pilots and the Mariners, in the first game ever played by each franchise. In these contests, he earned a hold for the Pilots in 1969, and absorbed the opening-day loss for the Mariners in 1977.

His most productive season came in 1969 for the Pilots, when he posted career-highs in wins (12) and saves (6), against only six losses. At the end of the season, his teammates voted him the Pilots' Most Valuable Player.

After he started the Mariners' inaugural game in 1977, he was dubbed "the Ancient Mariner," and, although he set a Mariners single-game record with 10 strikeouts early in the season on May 5, he failed to get a win the rest of the way. After compiling a 0–7 record with two saves and a 5.69 ERA in 40 games (seven starts), he was released at the end of the season.

Seguí continued pitching in the Mexican League for another 10 years, tossing a no-hitter for the Cafeteros de Córdoba during the 1978 season. During his Mexican stint, he amassed a 96–61 record with a 2.91 ERA and 1,025 strikeouts in 193 pitching appearances.

Seguí also pitched with four teams in the Venezuelan Winter League during 15 seasons between 1962 and 1983. He posted a 95–58 record and a 2.76 ERA in 213 games, setting a league's all-time record with 941 strikeouts, to surpass Aurelio Monteagudo (897) and José Bracho (748). This record is still unbeaten. He also ranks second in wins behind Bracho (109), third in complete games (68), and is fourth both in ERA and innings pitched.

Seguí was inducted into the Venezuelan Baseball Hall of Fame and Museum in 2003. He also gained induction into the Hispanic Heritage Baseball Museum Hall of Fame on August 19, 2006 in San Francisco, California. 

His son, David Seguí, is a former 15-season major league first baseman.

See also
 List of Major League Baseball players from Cuba
 List of Major League Baseball annual ERA leaders

References

External links
, or Retrosheet
Profile and chronology Baseball Library 
SABR BioProject – Article written by Joanne Hulbert
Mexican League statistics
Venezuelan Professional Baseball League statistics

1937 births
Living people
Acereros de Monclova players
American League ERA champions
Boston Red Sox players
Bravos de León players
Broncos de Reynosa players
Cafeteros de Córdoba players
Hawaii Islanders players
Industriales de Valencia players
Kansas City Athletics players
Leones de Yucatán players
Leones del Caracas players
Cuban expatriate baseball players in Venezuela
Llaneros de Portuguesa players
Major League Baseball pitchers
Major League Baseball players from Cuba
Cuban expatriate baseball players in the United States
Oakland Athletics players
People from Holguín
Pocatello Athletics players
St. Louis Cardinals players
Seattle Mariners players
Seattle Pilots players
Sioux City Soos players
Tigres de Aragua players
Tucson Cowboys players
Vancouver Mounties players
Washington Senators (1961–1971) players
Cuban expatriate baseball players in Nicaragua